Aachener Straße/Gürtel is an interchange station on the Cologne Stadtbahn lines 1, 7, and 13 in the district of Lindenthal in Cologne, North Rhine-Westphalia, Germany.

The station is located at the junction of Aachener Straße and the Cologne Belt (Gürtel). The station has four separate side platforms, each on one of the four median strips facing the junction.

See also 
 List of Cologne KVB stations

External links 
 station info page 
 

Cologne KVB stations
Lindenthal, Cologne